Events from the year 1504 in the Kingdom of Scotland.

Incumbents
Monarch – James IV

Events

Births
 unknown date – Patrick Hamilton, churchman, early Protestant Reformer and martyr (died 1528)

Deaths
 January – James Stewart, Duke of Ross (born 1476)

See also

 Timeline of Scottish history

References

 
Years of the 16th century in Scotland